Wind power in Wisconsin started in 1990 with the installation of the Lincoln Turbines wind farm, and contributes to the state's renewable portfolio standard established in 1998. In 2016, Wisconsin had a wind generating capacity of 648 megawatts (MW), responsible for generating 2.4% of its electricity. In 2019, this increased to a capacity of 737 MW, and a 2.63% of generation.

Regulations regarding the siting of wind turbines substantially hinder the development of wind farms in the state.

A 98 MW wind farm, the Quilt Block Wind Farm, was under construction in southwest Wisconsin as of February 2017.

Statistics 

Source:

Installations

See also

Solar power in Wisconsin
Wind power in the United States
Renewable energy in the United States

References